Visokoi Island is an uninhabited island in the Traversay Islands group of the South Sandwich Islands. It was discovered in 1819 by a Russian expedition under Fabian Gottlieb von Bellingshausen, who initially named the island Thorson Island in honor of Lieutenant , though the tsarist government later renamed the island Visokoi ("high"), after its conspicuous height, in response to Thorson's participation in the Decembrist revolt. The island was surveyed in 1930 by Discovery Investigations (DI) personnel, who charted and named many of its features. Several of the names given by DI were changed in 1953 by the United Kingdom Antarctic Place-Names Committee (UK-APC) to avoid redundancy with nearby features.

Geography 
The peak is named after Sir Arnold Weinholt Hodson, a governor of the Falkland Islands. The island has a strong smell of sulphurous fumes.

Finger Point marks the island's northern tip. It was named descriptively by DI in 1930.

Wordie Point is the south-west point of the island. DI personnel named it for Scottish geologist and polar explorer James Wordie.  north of it is Sulphur Point, whose reddish ground is streaked with sulphur. Originally called West Bluff by DI personnel, it was renamed by UK-APC to avoid confusion with West Bluff on nearby Zavodovski Island.

Irving Point, first discovered by von Bellingshausen's expedition, forms the eastern extremity of the island. DI personnel named it "Penguin Point," but UK-APC changed it to avoid redundancy with other similarly named locations. Irving Point was chosen for Royal Navy Lieutenant Commander J. Irving, who sketched the South Sandwich Islands from the Discovery II.

 northwest of Irving Point lies Saddle Bluff, named by DI personnel. Nearby Shamrock Hill, a prominent volcanic cone, was named by the survey party from  because they occupied this feature as a survey station on Saint Patrick's Day, 1964.

Mikhaylov Point is a small promontory marking the island's southern extremity. It was named "Low Point" by DI personnel, but the name was changed by UK-APC to avoid duplication with Low Point on nearby Vindication Island. The name "Mikhaylov Point" was recommended for Pavel N. Mikhaylov, artist aboard the Vostok during the Russian expedition under von Bellingshausen.

See also 
 List of Antarctic and sub-Antarctic islands

References

Further reading 
 
Hodson Volcano

Islands of the South Sandwich Islands
Volcanoes of the Atlantic Ocean
Volcanoes of South Georgia and the South Sandwich Islands
Uninhabited islands of South Georgia and the South Sandwich Islands